The Stage Door Swings is an album by bandleader and pianist Stan Kenton featuring performances of Broadway musical tunes recorded in 1958 and released on the Capitol label.

Reception

The Allmusic review by John Bush noted "Kenton's band of 1958 didn't boast the firepower of earlier editions, but new arrivals Jack Sheldon and Bill Trujillo contribute a lot".

Track listing
 "Lullaby of Broadway" (Harry Warren, Al Dubin) - 2:42
 "The Party's Over" (Jule Styne, Betty Comden, Adolph Green) - 2:58  
 "Baubles, Bangles, & Beads" (Robert Wright, George Forrest) - 2:45
 "Ev'ry Time We Say Goodbye" (Cole Porter) - 3:18
 "Whatever Lola Wants" (Richard Adler, Jerry Ross) - 2:29
 "Bali Ha'i" (Richard Rodgers, Oscar Hammerstein II) - 2:05
 "Hey There" (Adler, Ross) - 2:32
 "Younger Than Springtime" (Rodgers, Hammerstein) - 3:00
 "On the Street Where You Live" (Frederick Loewe, Alan Jay Lerner) - 2:12
 "I Love Paris" (Porter) - 2:28
 "I've Never Been in Love Before" (Frank Loesser) - 3:14
 "All at Once You Love Her" (Rodgers, Hammerstein) - 2:39

Personnel
Stan Kenton - piano, conductor, 
Bud Brisbois, Billy Catalano, Frank Huggins, Jack Sheldon, Al Sunseri  - trumpet
Jim Amlotte, Kent Larsen, Archie Le Coque - trombone
Bob Olson, Bill Smiley - bass trombone
Lennie Niehaus - alto saxophone, arranger
Bill Perkins, Bill Trujillo - tenor saxophone
Steve Perlow, Bill Robinson - baritone saxophone
Red Kelly- bass 
Jerry McKenzie - drums

References

 

Stan Kenton albums
1959 albums
Capitol Records albums
Albums conducted by Stan Kenton
Albums produced by Lee Gillette